Dileesh Philip (born 19 February 1980), also known as Dileesh Pothan is an Indian film director, actor and producer, who works in Malayalam cinema. He made his directorial debut with the 2016 comedy drama film Maheshinte Prathikaaram, starring Fahadh Faasil. The film received the Best Feature Film in Malayalam Award at the 64th National Film Awards. Pothan also won the Best Director Award at the 64th Filmfare Awards South.

Pothan began his career as an associate director to the 2010 film 9 KK Road. He served as an assistant director under Aashiq Abu, assisting in five of Aashiq's films. He made his acting debut as a film director in one scene in Aashiq Abu's 2011 film Salt N' Pepper. His second directional was Thondimuthalum Driksakshiyum (2017), which was also a critical and commercial hit. Thondimuthalum Driksakshiyum won the Best Feature Film in Malayalam Award as well at the 65th National Film Awards.
His third and latest film Joji, also starring Fahadh Faasil, released to highly positive reviews on the OTT platform of Amazon Prime Video in April 2021. Joji won the best International Film Award at the Swedish International Film Festival (SIFF 2021).

Personal life 
Pothan was born in Omalloor of Manjoor panchayat-village in northern Kottayam district, Kerala. He did his schooling at Emmanuel's High School, Kothanalloor. After pre-degree from Kuriakose Elias College, Mannanam, he pursued a BSc degree at St. Philomena's College, Mysore. Due to his keen interest in drama and cinema, he followed up with an M.A. in Theatre Arts at Sree Sankaracharya University of Sanskrit, Kalady and an M.Phil. in Theatre Arts from Mahatma Gandhi University, Kottayam. Pothan married Jimsy in December 2012 at St. Thomas Church, Kuruppanthara. They have a daughter and a son.

Film career 
Pothan started his film career as an assistant director in the film 9 KK Road (2010). Later on he became an associate director to Aashiq Abu. He assisted Aashiq Abu in films like 22 Female Kottayam (2012), Da Thadiya (2012), and Gangster (2014).  He was the chief associate director in Dileesh Nair's 2014 film Tamaar Padaar.

His first appearance in front of a movie camera was as a junior artist in the movie Chandranudikunna Dikkil (1999) directed by Lal Jose. Later his first proper role as an actor was in Salt N' Pepper. He has also acted in small roles mostly in Aashiq Abu's films, Salt N' Pepper (2011), 22 Female Kottayam (2012), Idukki Gold (2013), Gangster (2014), Iyobinte Pusthakam (2014), and Rani Padmini (2015). He has acted in several films since then.

Pothan ventured into film production by forming the film production company Working Class Hero in 2018, partnered by Syam Pushkaran. Their first movie was Kumbalangi Nights.

Filmography 

All films are in Malayalam language unless otherwise noted.

As director

As producer

As actor

As associate director 
 3 char sau bees(2010)
 22 Female Kottayam (2012)
 Da Thadiya (2012)
 5 Sundarikal (2013)
 Idukki Gold (2013)
 Gangster (2013)
 Tamaar Padaar (2014)

Awards

Filmmaking style
Pothen's filmmaking style―flirting with molecule level details, imbuing vibrance; one of its kind and stamping touches of sensationalism, is from the KG George school. But Pothen is also singularly distinctive in his approach, which is a delectable medley of native roots (classy old-school) and modern kerala. In Maheshinte Prathikaram, Pothen charts a butterfly effect idiom through remarkable attention for detail and sensational film language, using every medium―song, sky, rain, space, place and drama with consummated precision.

References

External links 
 

Malayalam film directors
1981 births
Film directors from Kochi
Male actors from Kochi
Male actors in Malayalam cinema
Indian male film actors
21st-century Indian male actors
Indian film actors
Indian film producers
Living people